is a railway station in the city of Fukushima, Fukushima Prefecture, Japan operated by Fukushima Kōtsū.

Lines
Hirano Station is served by the Iizaka Line and is located 6.2 km from the starting point of the line at

Station layout
Hirano Station has one side platform serving a single bi-directional track. It is usually staffed in the morning and evening. For times when the station is unattended, there is a machine that dispenses proof-of-departure tickets.

Adjacent stations

History
It was renamed to its present name on August 15, 1927.

Surrounding area
Hirano Post Office

See also
 List of railway stations in Japan

External links

  

Railway stations in Japan opened in 1925
Railway stations in Fukushima Prefecture
Fukushima Kōtsū Iizaka Line
Fukushima (city)